Hexachloroplatinate is an anion with the chemical formula [PtCl6]2−.

Chemical compounds containing the hexachloroplatinate anion include:
Chloroplatinic acid (or dihydrogen hexachloroplatinate), H2PtCl6
Ammonium hexachloroplatinate, (NH4)2PtCl6
Potassium hexachloroplatinate, K2PtCl6
Sodium hexachloroplatinate, Na2PtCl6

Related compounds/anions
The unstable hexachloropalladic acid (H2PdCl6)
Hexachloropalladate
Hexafluoroplatinate

Anions
 
Inorganic chlorine compounds
Platinum(IV) compounds
Chloro complexes
Chlorometallates